George Hepplewhite (5 September 1919 – 1989) was a professional footballer, who played for Huddersfield Town, Preston North End and Bradford City. He was born in Edmondsley, County Durham.

References

1919 births
1989 deaths
English footballers
People from County Durham (district)
Footballers from County Durham
Association football defenders
English Football League players
Huddersfield Town A.F.C. players
Preston North End F.C. players
Bradford City A.F.C. players